Wex or WEX may refer to:
 Wex, a collaboratively-edited legal dictionary and encyclopedia
 WEX Inc., a provider of payment processing and information management services
 County Wexford, the Chapman code WEX
 Wechselapparat, a World War I German flamethrower

People 
 Michael Wex, a Canadian novelist, playwright, translator, lecturer, performer, and author
 Bernard Wex, an English civil engineer
 Marianne Wex, a German feminist photographer, author, and self-healer